Julia Maddalena is an American voice actress who has worked on dubs of Japanese anime, cartoons, and video games.  Some of her major voice roles are Silvia Maruyama from Ground Defense Force! Mao-chan, Arusu from Tweeny Witches, Hikaru Shidou from Magic Knight Rayearth, Tamaki Nakamura from Samurai Girl: Real Bout High School, Sakuya Kumashiro from Tenchi in Tokyo, and Cotton from the anime film Oblivion Island: Haruka and the Magic Mirror. Early in her acting career, she portrayed Rachel in the 1984 movie adaptation of Children of the Corn.

Filmography

Anime
 3x3 Eyes – Ken-Ken (Streamline Dub)
 Battle Athletes Victory – Tanya Natdhipytadd
 Black Jack – Pinoko (Ep. 1–6)
 Cardcaptor Sakura Movie 2: The Sealed Card – Meiling Li
 Chobits – Yumi Omura
 Crayon Shin-chan – Mitsy Nohara (Phuuz dub)
 Cowboy Bebop – Hologram
 Digimon Adventure/Digimon Adventure 02 – Satoe Tachikawa
 El-Hazard series – Ura
 Fight! Iczer 1 – Mami 
 Figure 17 – Sakura Ibaragi
 Fushigi Yûgi – Yurein, Shoka (Eikoden)
 Gate Keepers – Kazu
 Ghost in the Shell: Stand Alone Complex – Tachikoma
 Giant Robo – Sunny the Magician (Animaze dub)
 Immortal Grand Prix – Himawari Aoi/Jesse Martin (microseries & TV series), Luca (microseries)
 Kurogane Communication – Haruka
 Kuromukuro – Elizabeth Butler
 Lily C.A.T. – Nancy
 Love Hina – Sarah McDougall
 Magic Knight Rayearth - Hikaru Shidou
 Mao-chan – Silvia
 Mobile Suit Gundam F91 – Reese Arno
 Oblivion Island: Haruka and the Magic Mirror – Cotton
 Overman King Gainer – Cona Madaya
 Please Twins! – Yuka Yashiro
 Phantom Quest Corp. – Makiko Mizuno
 Saber Marionette J Again – Lime
 Saint Tail – Sayaka Shinomiya
 Samurai Girl Real Bout High School – Tamaki Nakamura
 Someday's Dreamers – Runa
 Super Pig – Super Pig/Kassie Carlen
 Teknoman – Tina Corman
 Tenchi in Tokyo – Sakuya Kumashiro, Matori
 Tenchi Muyo! GXP – Hakuren, Mrs. Yamada
 Tenchi the Movie 2: The Daughter of Darkness – Mayuka
 Trigun – Jessica
 Tweeny Witches – Arusu
 Vandread – Dita Liebely
 WXIII: Patlabor the Movie 3 – Hitomi Misaki
 Wild Arms – Mirabelle Graceland
 Witch Hunter Robin – Methuselah (Young)
 Wolf's Rain – Mew
 Ys – Lilia
 The Adventures of Pinocchio – Pinocchio

Animation
 Ever After High – Blondie Lockes, Cheshire Cat
 Deer Squad – Professor Scratch
 Secret Millionaires Club – Elena
 Monster High – Venus McFlytrap, Robecca Steam
 The Toy Warrior – Princess Sherbet
 The Power of Animals – Emma
 The Twilight Fairies – Sabrina Cox, additional voices
 LeapFrog – Tad (2 DVDs)

Live action
 Adventures in Voice Acting – Herself
 Masked Rider – Fact (voice)
 Mighty Morphin' Power Rangers – Arachnofiend (voice, uncredited)
 Power Rangers In Space, Power Rangers Lost Galaxy – D.E.C.A. (voice, credited as Julie Kliewer in PRiS)
 Children of the Corn – Rachel Colby (debut role)

Film
 NiNoKuni – Dandy (Netflix dub)

Video games
 .hack series – Ryoko Terajima
 Akiba's Trip: Hellbound & Debriefed – Additional voices
 Galerians – Lilia Pascalle
 Ghost in the Shell – Fuchikoma
 Fire Emblem Heroes - Sharena, Lilina, and Florina
 Nier: Automata – Additional voices
 Pac-Man and the Ghostly Adventures – Pinky
 Star Ocean: First Departure – Ilia Silvestri

References

External links
 
 Julie Maddalena at the CrystalAcids Anime Voice Actor Database
 

Living people
American video game actresses
American voice actresses
21st-century American women
Year of birth missing (living people)